Sunnybank railway station is located on the Beenleigh line in Queensland, Australia. It is one of three stations serving the Brisbane suburb of Sunnybank, the others being Altandi and Banoon.

In 2008, an upgrade of the station was completed as part of the Salisbury to Kuraby triplication project. This included converting the western platform to an island, and a new footbridge with lifts.

Services
Sunnybank station is served by all stops Beenleigh line services from Beenleigh and Kuraby to Bowen Hills and Ferny Grove.

Services by platform

References

External links

Sunnybank station Queensland's Railways on the Internet
[ Sunnybank station] TransLink travel information

Railway stations in Brisbane